Hidden Führer: Debating the Enigma of Hitler's Sexuality is a documentary film based on the research of German Professor Lothar Machtan for his 2001 book The Hidden Hitler that claimed Adolf Hitler was a homosexual. Aired by HBO's CINEMAX Reel Life, the 90 minute documentary was directed by Fenton Bailey, Randy Barbato and Gabriel Rotello and was produced by Gabriel Rotello.

Other interviews in the documentary include those with:

 Geoffrey Giles, author of a study of gays in the Nazi party, professor at the University of Florida
 Brigitte Hamann, German historian and author
 Ron Rosenbaum, author of Explaining Hitler
 Ralf Dose, German gay historian and founder of the Magnus Hirschfeld Society
 Michelangelo Signorile, gay activist author

Reception
Of the film, a Variety review called it "a platform for taking Machtan's argument seriously."
Matthew Gilbert of The Boston Globe stated "It's a more cerebral and conventional documentary", dull and "poorly balanced scale". Andrea Gronvall of Chicago Reader said "sketchy evidence" and "transforming gossip into entertainment".

Controversy
Most mainstream historians and surviving eyewitnesses dispute Machtan's argument (see Sexuality of Adolf Hitler).

References

External links
 
 Cinemax website for Hidden Führer: Debating the Enigma of Hitler's Sexuality
 New York Times film review for Hidden Führer: Debating the Enigma of Hitler's Sexuality

2004 television films
2004 films
Documentary films about same-sex sexuality
Documentary films about Adolf Hitler
LGBT in Nazi Germany
2004 LGBT-related films